

Science, technology, and medicine 
 Personal flotation device
 Pelvic floor dysfunction
 Phase frequency detector in electronics
 Primary flight display, in an aircraft
 Probability of Failure on Demand, see Safety integrity level#Certification
 Process flow diagram, in process engineering
 Prepared for dyeing
 Professional Disc, recordable optical disc format
 PFD allowance in work systems
 Partial fraction decomposition
 Perfluorodecalin, a molecule capable of dissolving large amounts of gas
 Pediatric Feeding Disorder, A unifying diagnostic term, “pediatric feeding disorder” encompassing medical, nutrition, feeding skill, and psychosocial domains

Organizations 
 Philadelphia Fire Department
 Pigespejdernes Fællesråd Danmark, Guiding federation of Denmark
 Peters, Fraser & Dunlop, an English literary and talent agency

Other uses 
 Permanent Fund Dividend of Alaska Permanent Fund

See also 
PDF (disambiguation)